Simmba is a 2018 Indian Hindi-language action film directed by Rohit Shetty and produced by Rohit Shetty Picturez, Reliance Entertainment and Dharma Productions. The third installment of Shetty's Cop Universe, it stars Ranveer Singh, Sonu Sood and Sara Ali Khan with Ajay Devgn reprising his role of Singham in a cameo role. A remake of the 2015 Telugu film Temper, the film follows Sangram "Simmba" Bhalerao, a corrupt police officer hailing from the same town as Singham, who is forced to lead a more righteous path after tragedy strikes those near him.

Principal photography began in June 2018 with most scenes filmed in Goa and Kolhapur; the remaining were shot at Hyderabad and Mehboob Studios in Mumbai. The shooting was wrapped up by early December in the same year. The film's soundtrack was composed by Tanishk Bagchi, Lijo George – DJ Chetas and S. Thaman, with lyrics written by Shabbir Ahmed, Rashmi Virag, Kumaar and Kunaal Verma. The soundtrack features remakes of two 1996 songs: "Aankh Marey" originally from the film Tere Mere Sapne, and the qawwali song "Tere Bin" by Nusrat Fateh Ali Khan.

Simmba was released in countries of the Gulf Cooperation Council on 27 December 2018. The film was released in India and other international territories on the following day; it was distributed worldwide by Reliance Entertainment. The film received mixed reviews  from critics but became Singh's highest-earning opening film as of 2018 and went on to gross about 400 crore worldwide, becoming the 25th highest grossing Indian film of all time. Later, it received the Australian Telstra People's Choice Award.

Plot 
Sangram "Simmba" Bhalerao is an antiheroic orphan from Shivgad, the same town where Bajirao Singham was raised, where he observes how policemen make money in the form of bribes, finding himself motivated to become a police officer, and succeeds. Getting bribes from some local thieves and a jeweller, Simmba enjoys and takes full advantage of the lifestyle of a corrupt cop.

Simmba is soon transferred to the Miramar police station in Goa by Home Minister Vinayak Dutta, where he sees Shagun Sathe and falls in love with her at first sight. He meets his fellow policemen and one of his juniors, Nityanand Mohile, who is an honest constable, hesitates to salute Simmba as he's a corrupt cop. To prove his worth in Miramar, he interrupts a pub party run by an influential gangster named Durva Yashwant Ranade's brothers, Sadashiv "Sada" Ranade and Gaurav "Giri" Ranade and demands more money from them, whilst promising that he will let them continue with their illegal activities. 

Durva agrees and uses Simmba to free the land of an old person named Vaman Rao, who is forced to sign the papers by Simmba. Meanwhile, Simmba develops motherly and sisterly bonds with several women and girls, one of whom happens to be Aakruti Dave, a young woman who reminds Simmba of his teacher. Aakruti files a complaint against Sada and Giri for dealing illicit drugs in their pub and using children as peddlers. Simmba initially ignores this after being pacified by Durva, and Shagun, in the meantime, falls in love with him. 

Meanwhile, Aakruti learns about the drug racket in the club and goes there one night with Chhotu, a mute boy who's her student. She videotapes everything there by her cell phone to show evidence to the police but is caught by Sada and Giri. Chhotu discreetly records Sada and Giri assaulting Aakruti and flees once both of them realize. Aakruti is brutally raped by Sada and Giri. Chhotu tries to tell Aakruti's friend Kavya about Aakruti being in danger. Kavya whilst being chased by Durva's goons goes to Simmba to file Aakruti's missing complaint. 

Aakruti is found injured in hospital. Simmba tries to talk to her, but she dies, leaving him devastated. The police recover Aakruti's phone and the video which she shot, and Durva sends his goons to get the phone from Simmba, who is present, mends his ways, and fights them all. Simmba finally wears his police uniform, and seeing this change in him, Mohile finally salutes him as they arrest Sada and Giri. He apologises to Vaman Rao and returns the land swindled from him. 

In the court, Simmba is shocked to find Aakruti's video being deleted. He beats up Durva's friend, Corporator David Cameron, who gave a false statement in the court, leading to his suspension orders. He decides to kill Sada and Giri before he goes, and plans to show it as an encounter. He shoots them both and shows as if he killed them in the act of self-defence. An SIT committee is set up by the state, who question Simmba's encounter. Aiming to achieve clarity to the situation, Vinayak appoints a neutral officer to handle Aakruti's case, as well as Simmba's controversial encounter.

Enraged, Durva and his goons capture Simmba. Suddenly, DCP Bajirao Singham arrives to rescue him, and both of them beat up Durva and his men. Singham tells Simmba that he is the neutral officer appointed by the state committee to handle his case and gives a statement that Simmba killed Sadashiv and Gaurav in the act of self-defence. He also calls Durva's mother Bharti and wife Varsha, who each state that it was Sada and Giri who assaulted Aakruti and that the brothers ran a drug racket and several other illegal activities. 

As a result of these crimes, Durva is sentenced to 7 years of rigorous imprisonment by the court. Singham reveals that he helped Simmba despite being against his corrupt actions so that he could instil a fear of law in the minds of men who do not respect women. When Singham leaves Miramar Police Station, he chats with DCP Veer Sooryavanshi on the phone. and also congratulates him on his new post as the ATS chief. Sooryavanshi tells him that he will meet him soon.

Cast

Production 
It is a remake of the Telugu-language film Temper (2015). Shetty said, "We wanted to take four-five scenes from Temper but... thought it's better to buy the rights".
Principal photography for Simmba began in June 2018.  It was mainly filmed in Goa and Kolhapur, with some filming in Hyderabad and extra sequences filmed at Mehboob Studios in Mumbai.

On 29 June 2018, the crew filmed the song, "Simmba Aala Re Aala Simmba Aala", at Ramoji Film City in Hyderabad.  On Instagram, Singh noted the large scale of the production and said that it was the biggest song of his career.

Legal issues surrounding the production of Khan's debut-film Kedarnath interfered with the production of Simmba. Khan was scheduled to shoot for both films around the same time. A lawsuit shut down the production of Kedarnath and Khan allotted the time to work on Simmba. Kedarnath's director, Abhishek Kapoor, sued Khan because his film would be delayed and it would no longer mark the debut of Khan. The two settled out of court when Khan agreed to split her time between both films.

In October 2018, lead actors Singh and Khan left for Switzerland to film a song sequence for the film. By late October, the crew had returned to Mumbai to film a second song, "Aankh Marey"—a remake of a 90s classic song.

Because Singh was to be married in November 2018, Shetty shot most of the major sequences before the wedding date. Only the final sequence was left to be filmed after the wedding. A double for Singh was used to complete patch work of a dhaba fight scene in Goa; various camera angles were used so that the double would resemble Singh.

The film wrapped shooting in early December 2018.

Soundtrack 

The songs are composed by Tanishk Bagchi, Lijo George – DJ Chetas and S. Thaman while the lyrics are written by Shabbir Ahmed, Rashmi Virag, Kumaar and Kunaal Vermaa. The soundtrack album was released on 27 December 2018.

The song "Aankh Maarey" is a remake of the song "Aankh Maare" from the 1996 film Tere Mere Sapne, originally composed by Viju Shah and written by Anand Bakshi, sung by Kumar Sanu and Kavita Krishnamurthy, and picturised on Arshad Warsi and Simran; Warsi makes a cameo appearance in the Simmba version's music video, with Sanu's voice. The song was remade for the film, with the music reproduced by Tanishk Bagchi, S. Thaman  and Chandan Saxena. The song "Tere Bin" is a recreation of Nusrat Fateh Ali Khan's 1996 qawwali song "Tere Bin Nahin Lagda". This is the second time the song is being recreated after 1999's film Kachche Dhaage which was titled "Tere Bin Nahin Jeena" sung by Lata Mangeshkar. The remake is sung by his nephew Rahat Fateh Ali Khan with Asees Kaur.

Marketing and release 

Simmba was released in countries of the Gulf Cooperation Council on 27 December 2018. It was released in India and other countries on 28 December. It was shown on 4020 screens in India and 963 screens overseas, for a worldwide screen total of 4983 screens.

On 6 June 2018, the producers announced the start of principal photography with a skit video featuring actors Singh and Khan, director Shetty, and producer Johar.

On 6 December 2018, the first song from the film was released, titled "Aankh Marey," a remake of the original song from the 1996 hit film Tere Mere Sapne.  It is sung by Kumar Sanu (who also sung the original with Kavita Krishnamurthy), Mika Singh, and Neha Kakkar.  Actor Arshad Warsi, whose film and song debut was with the original, appeared again in the video for the Simmba remake, along with several actors from another film from director Rohit Shetty, Golmaal: Kunal Khemu, Shreyas Talpade, and Tusshar Kapoor. The release date for the remake was specifically chosen to coincide with the release date of the original 22 years earlier (6 December 1996).

Reception

Critical response 
Ambica Schin of Khaleej Times gave the film four stars out of five and sums up, "If you are on the lookout for a totally masala, paisa vasool movie to end the year with a bang, we recommend you watch Simmba. The melodramatic, over-the-top film is sure to leave you on a high". Taran Adarsh of Bollywood Hungama declared it a "winner" with four stars out of five, writing, "Rohit borrows the essence from Temper, but modifies a major chunk of that film... What eventually unfolds on screen is so different, in a positive way". Anwesha Madhukalya of Business Today wrote, "It is indeed time to rejoice for the young star's fans for Simmba has announced the arrival of Ranveer Singh in the big league".

Writing for The Times of India, Ronak Kotecha rated it three and a half stars out of five, terming the film as "a potboiler that you expect it to be, where the good surely outweighs the bad". Suparno Sarkar of International Business Times also gave it three and a half stars out of five, writing, "Simmba is a complete masala entertainer that is loaded with good dialogues, humour, heart-felt emotion and high-octane action. It lacks logic at various levels, but never ceases to entertain". A critic for The Economic Times agreed, also rating it three and a half stars out of five, but felt that "[t]he film takes a preachy turn in the second half and the narrative gets predictable".

Writing for Hindustan Times, Raja Sen rated the film three stars out of five, writing, "[A]s it stands, Simmba is not only ahead of Singham, but far superior to Dabangg, the blockbuster that defines the genre". He appreciated Singh for the energy he brought to the role, but found Khan was restricted by her role. Rajeev Masand of News18 gave the film two and a half stars out of five, finding the first half to be "a sporadically enjoyable comedy", but found the second half to be "less enjoying": "The film leaves a lot to be desired, but a star is re-born". Uday Bhatia of Mint concurred with Masand: but credited Singh for playing his "cardboard creation" of a character with an "underlying sweetness that renders it more winsome than the humourless masculinity of Devgan's Singham".

Box office 
The box office collection figures for the opening weekend of the film as presented on Bollywood Hungama are: The first day It earned 20.72 crore nett in India, which made it Singh's highest-opening film as of 2018. On second day it collected 23.33 crore nett and 31.06 crore on third day. The total first weekend nett domestic collection was 75.11 crore. The opening week pan-India collection was  150.81 crore, which made it a hit film.

In its second week on the eighth day, domestic collection was 9.02 crore. On the ninth day, collection rose to 13.32 crore. Tenth day collection is 17.49 crore. Eleventh day collection is 6.16. Twelfth day collection is 6.03. Thirteen day collection is 5.31 and ending at 4.29 crore, taking second week collection to 61.62 crore. The domestic gross is 308.09 crore. It becomes Rohit Shetty's biggest hit as it beats lifetime business of Chennai Express.

The film grossed  from overseas markets as estimated by Bollywood Hungama. It became third highest-grossing film of 2018. In Pakistan, the film has collected more than  till its fifth weekend.

Animated series 
Smashing Simmba, an animated television series based on the film, was released on 14 November 2020 on Pogo TV.

References

External links 
 
 
 

Indian action films
2010s masala films
Films directed by Rohit Shetty
Cop Universe
2010s Hindi-language films
Films shot in Goa
Films shot in Switzerland
Films shot in Hyderabad, India
Films shot in Mumbai
Telstra People's Choice Award winners
Film spin-offs
Indian rape and revenge films
Indian films about revenge
Films set in Goa
Fictional portrayals of the Maharashtra Police
Reliance Entertainment films
Films about rape in India
Indian police films
Hindi remakes of Telugu films
2018 action films
Hindi-language action films
Films adapted into television shows